is a video game in the Mega Man Battle Network series for mobile phones developed by Capcom. The game was only released and made available in Japan. It is most well known for featuring five original characters that did not appear in any other video games: the magician  with his NetNavi  and son , as well as the NetNavis  and Cache. All of these characters, however, appeared in the Rockman EXE anime series. The game was followed by a Japan-exclusive sequel for mobile phones entitled Rockman EXE Legend of Network.

As of January 1, 2018, Phantom of Network, along with Legend of Network, has been taken offline and is no longer available for purchase.

References

External links
ケータイカプコン：i-mode (Official homepage)

Phantom of Network
Role-playing video games
Japan-exclusive video games
Mobile games
Tactical role-playing video games
Video games developed in Japan
2004 video games